Huelva may refer to:

 Huelva, a city in southern Spain
 Huelva (surname), list of people with the surname
 Province of Huelva, the province of Spain with Huelva as its capital
 Roman Catholic Diocese of Huelva, which has the same boundaries as the province
 Huelva (Spanish Congress Electoral District), which also coincides geographically with the province
 University of Huelva, in the city of Huelva
 Recreativo de Huelva, a professional football (soccer) team based in the city of Huelva
 Recreativo de Huelva B, the reserve team of Recreativo de Huelva
 Sporting de Huelva, a women's football club based in the city of Huelva
 CB Ciudad de Huelva, a former professional basketball team that was based in the city of Huelva
 Condado de Huelva, a Denominación de Origen (DO) for wines located in the south-east of the province of Huelva
 Huelva International Film Festival